Cruyt Spur is a rocky spur  northeast of Ruth Ridge and  north-northeast of Papiya Nunatak, extending  southeast from the south wall of Detroit Plateau, on the Nordenskjöld Coast of Graham Land, Antarctica. It is surmounting Aleksiev Glacier to the northeast and Kladorub Glacier to the southwest.  The spur was mapped from surveys by the Falkland Islands Dependencies Survey (1960–61), and named by the UK Antarctic Place-Names Committee for William Cruyt, a Belgian army engineer who designed the first "auto-polaire" in 1907.

References 

 SCAR Composite Antarctic Gazetteer.

Ridges of Graham Land
Nordenskjöld Coast